Walla Walla High School (commonly Wa-Hi) is a public high school in Walla Walla, Washington that is a part of the Walla Walla School District. The school colors are blue and white and the mascot is the Blue Devils.

Notable alumni
Drew Bledsoe, NFL quarterback, class of 1990

Adam West, Actor Batman
Dean Derby, Professional Football Player, class of 1953

References

External links
Walla Walla Public Schools
Walla Walla High School homepage
Walla Walla High School collection at the Whitman College and Northwest Archives, Whitman College.

Educational institutions with year of establishment missing
High schools in Walla Walla County, Washington
Walla Walla, Washington
Public high schools in Washington (state)